Pfadt Race Engineering is an engineering firm located in Salt Lake City, Utah. The company develops, manufactures, and sells high-performance automotive components for GM lines. Its founder, Aaron Pfadt, built the company into one of the leading developers of aftermarket Corvette and Camaro suspension components. It is one of the few companies in the United States that engineers, manufactures, and assembles all of its aftermarket performance products domestically for the GM line. In 2011 it was listed as one of Utah's fastest growing companies, ranking number 16. It has also been the receiver of other awards for its rapid growth and success as a leader in the automotive industry.

History 
After graduating from engineering school, Aaron Pfadt moved to Detroit to begin his career at General Motors. While in Detroit, he spent a lot of time working on Corvettes and watching races. It was then that he had the idea of modifying a Corvette to make it competitive with cars like the Porsche and BMW. Shortly thereafter, he moved to Salt Lake City, Utah, to found Pfadt Engineering.

After experiencing a period of rapid growth selling Corvette parts, the company launched new suspension lines for the Camaro and Cadillac ATS. It also launched exhaust headers for Corvette and Camaro, all manufactured in house at the Salt Lake facility. The company partnered with Advanced FLOW engineering, based in Corona, California, to manufacture and sell the Pfadt product line. Under the company's new Advanced Control Engineering division and Pfadt's management, the new company continues to focus on suspension products.

Awards 
In 2011 Pfadt Race Engineering achieved #16 on the Mountain West Capital Network's Utah 100 list of Fastest Growth Companies. In 2012 Pfadt Race Engineering achieved #59 on the Mountain West Capital Network's Utah 100 list of Fastest Growth Companies.

Product line 
The GM-based track experience of owner Aaron Pfadt heavily influenced on the initial product line. A majority of the original line was focused on C5 and C6 Corvette suspension. After gaining recognition as one of the leading Corvette suspension retailers, they expanded the product line to include the fifth-generation Camaro as well. Among these changes, they have also shifted their focus to a line of power adding products such as performance exhaust headers and a turbo kit for the Cadillac ATS 2.0 L platform which is capable of producing over 450 HP.

GM Factory driver Johnny O'Connell
In 2010, Aaron Pfadt and Johnny O'Connell launched a new Corvette suspension line carrying O'Connell's signature and design input.  This long-term partnership continues today. As a GM Factory driver, O'Connell has a record including four wins at LaMans, and as the driver of the championship Cadillac ATS. As an aftermarket upgrade appropriate for both street and track use, the original package included sway bars and shock absorbers.  After the growth in popularity of the line continued, the two paired again to launch a track day specific package featuring adjustable coil overs and adjustable sway bars.

BMW
Upon the acquisition by Advanced Flow Engineering, the company developed and launched a series of suspension components for the BMW.  The lineup includes drop springs, sway bars and coil overs, all engineered, developed, and built in Corona, California.

Ford Mustang
The company entered the Ford Mustang market with a suspension package including lowering springs and sway bars.

Transition to AFE 
With the growth in sales and additional product line launches the company worked to keep up with demand and ultimately found a partner in Advanced Control Engineering. After a brief downtime as the new deal was finalized, the new company opened in August 2014 and began to ship products. Since the transition, the company has launched new products for the BMW and the new Mustang, adding to the existing line up of GM-based products. Located on the 150,000-square-foot facility of the Corona, California, headquarters, the company continues to manufacture its suspension and exhaust header lineup.

References 

Automotive part retailers of the United States